Hemilienardia subspurca is a species of sea snail, a marine gastropod mollusk in the family Raphitomidae.

Description
The length of the shell varies between 5 mm and 9 mm.

Distribution
This marine species occurs off the Loyalty Islands, New Caledonia and Taiwan.

References

 Fischer-Piette, E., 1950. - Liste des types décrits dans le Journal de Conchyliologie et conservés dans la collection de ce journal (avec planches)(suite). Journal de Conchyliologie 90: 149-180
 Wiedrick S.G. (2017). Aberrant geomorphological affinities in four conoidean gastropod genera, Clathurella Carpenter, 1857 (Clathurellidae), Lienardia Jousseaume, 1884 (Clathurellidae), Etrema Hedley, 1918 (Clathurellidae) and Hemilienardia Boettger, 1895 (Raphitomidae), with the descriptionof fourteen new Hemilienardia species from the Indo-Pacific. The Festivus. special issue: 2-45.

External links
 Hervier J. (1896 ["1895"). Descriptions d'espèces nouvelles de l'Archipel Néo-Calédonien. Journal de Conchyliologie. 43(3): 141-152]
 
 MNHN, Paris: syntype
 Gastropods.com: Kermia subspurcum

subspurca
Gastropods described in 1896